Marcus Karl Gustav Pettersson (born 8 May 1996) is a Swedish professional ice hockey player for the Pittsburgh Penguins of the National Hockey League (NHL).  His nickname is The Dragon.

Playing career
Pettersson made his Swedish Hockey League debut playing with Skellefteå AIK during the 2013–14 SHL season.

Pettersson was selected by the Anaheim Ducks in the second round (38th overall) of the 2014 NHL Entry Draft.

On 13 June 2015, Pettersson was signed to a three-year entry-level contract with the Anaheim Ducks. Petterson was called up to the NHL on 21 February 2018, and he recorded his first NHL goal on 4 March, in a 6–3 win against the Chicago Blackhawks.

During the 2018–19 season, on 3 December 2018, Pettersson was traded by the Ducks to the Pittsburgh Penguins in exchange for Daniel Sprong. Pettersson scored his first goal with the Penguins on 7 February 2019 against the Florida Panthers. On 12 September 2019, Pettersson re-signed with the Penguins on a one-year contract worth $874,125.

On 28 January 2020, Pettersson signed a five-year, $20.125 million contract extension with the Penguins.

International play
On 9 May 2019, Pettersson was named to make his senior international debut with Sweden at the 2019 World Championships held in Bratislava, Slovakia.

Personal life
Marcus is the son of Daniel Pettersson, who played for Skellefteå AIK for 14 seasons.

Career statistics

Regular season and playoffs

International

References

External links
 

1996 births
Living people
Anaheim Ducks draft picks
Anaheim Ducks players
HC Vita Hästen players
People from Skellefteå Municipality
Pittsburgh Penguins players
San Diego Gulls (AHL) players
Skellefteå AIK players
Swedish ice hockey defencemen
Sportspeople from Västerbotten County